Church Row, Wandsworth is a Grade II* listed row of houses at 1–6, Wandsworth Plain, London SW18.

This terrace of Georgian houses was built in 1723.

References

External links

Grade II* listed houses in London
Houses completed in 1723
Houses in the London Borough of Wandsworth
1723 establishments in England